Elisabeth of Bavaria, or Elisabeth of Wittelsbach, may refer to:

Wives of the rulers of Bavaria
 Elisabeth of Hungary, Duchess of Bavaria (1236–1271), wife of Henry XIII, Duke of Bavaria
 Elisabeth of Sicily, Duchess of Bavaria (1310–1349), wife of Stephen II, Duke of Bavaria
 Isabelle of Lorraine (d. 1335), wife of Louis III, Duke of Bavaria
 Elisabetta Visconti (1374–1432), wife of Ernest, Duke of Bavaria
 Elisabeth of Cleves (1378–1424), wife of Stephen III, Duke of Bavaria
 Elisabeth of Görlitz (1390–1451), wife of John III, Duke of Bavaria
 Elisabeth of Lorraine (1574–1635), wife of Maximilian I, Elector of Bavaria
 Countess Palatine Elisabeth Auguste of Sulzbach (1721–1794), wife of Charles Theodore, Elector of Bavaria

Other women
 Elisabeth of Bavaria, Queen of Germany (1227–1273), wife of King Conrad IV of Germany
 Elizabeth of Bavaria, Duchess of Austria (1306–1330), first wife of Otto, Duke of Austria
 Isabeau of Bavaria (originally called Elisabeth) (1370–1435), wife of Charles VI of France
 Elisabeth of Bavaria, Electress of Brandenburg (1383–1442), wife of Frederick I, Elector of Brandenburg
 Elisabeth of Bavaria-Landshut, Countess of Württemberg (1419–1451), wife of Ulrich V, Count of Württemberg
 Elisabeth of Bavaria, Electress of Saxony (1443–1484), wife of Ernest, Elector of Saxony
 Elisabeth of Bavaria (1478–1504), Duchess of Bavaria-Landshut
 Elisabeth Ludovika of Bavaria (1801–1873), wife of Frederick William IV of Prussia
 Elisabeth of Bavaria, Empress of Austria, (1837–1898), wife of Emperor Franz Joseph I
 Princess Isabella of Bavaria (1863–1924), daughter of Prince Adalbert of Bavaria (1828–1875)
 Princess Elisabeth Marie of Bavaria (1874–1957), daughter of Prince Leopold of Bavaria
 Elisabeth of Bavaria, Queen of Belgium (1876–1965), wife of King Albert I of Belgium
 Duchess Elisabeth in Bavaria (born 1973), daughter of Prince Max, Duke in Bavaria and Countess Elisabeth, Duchess in Bavaria